Ronald Jason Lively (born March 12, 1968) is an American actor. He is best known for European Vacation (1985), Night of the Creeps (1986), and Ghost Chase (1987).

Early life
Ronald Jason Lively was born on March 12, 1968 in Carroll County, Georgia, the son of talent manager Elaine (née McAlpin) and her first husband, Ronald Otis Lively. He is the adoptive son of actor Ernie Lively, the brother of actresses Lori Lively and Robyn Lively, and the half-brother of actor Eric Lively and actress Blake Lively.

Career
Lively started his career by appearing in the pilot episode of The Dukes of Hazzard when he was 10 years old. His first film appearance was four years later in the 1983 film Brainstorm. That same year he also had another appearance in The Dukes of Hazzard. His most recognizable roles came later when he played Rusty Griswald in National Lampoon's European Vacation, and Chris in Night of the Creeps. After that, he appeared in the films Ghost Chase and Maximum Force. In 1993, he appeared in the video game Return to Zork, along with his sisters, Robyn Lively and Lori Lively.

Post-acting career
Lively has worked for a computer company and was also owner and operator of Jimmy Crack Corn, a mobile roasted corn business.

Filmography

Film and television

Video games

References

External links

1968 births
20th-century American male actors
American male child actors
American male film actors
American male television actors
Living people
Place of birth missing (living people)
Jason